The United Provinces of Armagh and Tuam, commonly called the Province of Armagh, and also known as the Northern Province, is one of the two ecclesiastical provinces that together form the Anglican Church of Ireland; the other is the Province of Dublin. The province has existed since 1833, when the ancient Province of Armagh was merged with the Province of Tuam. The Archbishop of Armagh is its metropolitan bishop.

Geographic remit 

There are six suffragan dioceses in the Province, which cover all of Northern Ireland and, in the Republic of Ireland, the counties of Donegal, Monaghan, Cavan, Louth, Leitrim, part of Sligo, Roscommon (except for its very south), Longford. It covers approximately half of the island of Ireland.

The dioceses are:
Armagh
Clogher
Connor
Derry and Raphoe
Down and  Dromore
Kilmore, Elphin and  Ardagh

See also 

 List of Anglican dioceses in the United Kingdom and Ireland

Church of Ireland
Religion in County Armagh
Ecclesiastical provinces of the Anglican Communion in Europe